The men's high jump event at the 2004 World Junior Championships in Athletics was held in Grosseto, Italy, at Stadio Olimpico Carlo Zecchini on 13 and 15 July.

Medalists

Results

Final
15 July

Qualifications
13 July

Group A

Group B

Participation
According to an unofficial count, 24 athletes from 20 countries participated in the event.

References

High jump
High jump at the World Athletics U20 Championships